Ang Bagong Kampeon was a nationally televised amateur singing contest that aired on Radio Philippines Network (Solar TV) in the Philippines. It aired from 1982 to October 1988. It was hosted by Bert Marcelo and Pilita Corrales. The television show has launched the careers of several successful singers, notably, Regine Velasquez and Donna Cruz.

The show also had a contestant named Josephine Roberto (aka "Banig"), who later defeated Christina Aguilera on the way to become Female Vocalist Champion in the 1989 edition of Star Search in the United States.

Later in 1989, Ang Bagong Kampeon was again aired on RPN 9 which was hosted by Pepe Pimentel and Amy Perez. Among the notable contestant was Teofanes Barbi Daclan who sang songs of Matt Monro and made up to the grand finals.

Awards and recognitions
 Best Talent Show Winner — PMPC Star Awards for Television (1987–1988)

References

Philippine reality television series
1985 Philippine television series debuts
1988 Philippine television series endings
Radio Philippines Network original programming
1980s Philippine television series